Broad church is latitudinarian churchmanship in the Church of England in particular and Anglicanism in general. The term is often used for secular political organisations, meaning that they encompass a broad range of opinion.

Religious usage
After the terms high church and low church came to distinguish the tendency toward ritualism and Anglo-Catholicism on the one hand and evangelicalism on the other, those Anglicans tolerant of multiple forms of conformity to ecclesiastical authority came to be referred to as "broad". The expression apparently originated with A. H. Clough and was current in the later part of the 19th century for Anglicans who objected to positive definitions in theology and sought to interpret Anglican formularies in a broad and liberal sense. Characteristic members of this group were the contributors to Essays and Reviews, 1860, and A. P. Stanley. As the name implies, parishes associated with this variety of churchmanship will mix high and low forms, reflective of the often eclectic liturgical and doctrinal preferences of clergy and laity. The emphasis is on allowing individual parishioners' choice.

Broad church as an expression is now increasingly replaced by references in the Church of England to liberalism.  For example, Rowan Williams, the former archbishop of Canterbury, in his "text of reflection" The Challenge and Hope of Being an Anglican Today, released in 2006, described the three "components in our heritage" as "strict evangelical Protestantism", "Roman Catholicism" and "religious liberalism", accepting that "each of these has a place in the church’s life".  These would broadly correspond to the low church, high church and broad church parties in the Church of England.  It has been suggested that "broad" tended to be used to describe those of middle of the road liturgical preferences who leaned theologically towards liberal Protestantism; whilst "central" described those who were theologically conservative, but took the middle way in terms of liturgical practices. Broad churchmen might best be described as those who are generally liberal in theology, often culturally conservative, but also supportive of a broad—that is, comprehensive—Anglican Church including Evangelical Anglicans, "middle of the road" or "vanilla Anglicans" or "central churchmen", liberal or "progressive" Anglicans, moderate high churchmen, and Anglo-Catholic Anglicans (though not fundamentalist on the one extreme nor papalists on the other). It is not possible to draw sharp lines between some of these traditions.

In The Episcopal Church in the United States, the term "broad church" has a slightly different connotation, referring to those whose liturgical practice is neither high nor low church. Theologically, they may be either conservative—equating to central churchmanship in the Church of England—or liberal, which would identify them with the broad church or liberal strand within the Church of England.

In politics
By way of an analogy, the term has also been used with regard to political parties, particularly the British Labour Party. It can denote both a wide range of ideological views within a single organisation, as well as describe a party that seeks to attract a wide voter base with differing points of view. "Big tent" is a similar term in American politics, also with religious origins.

See also

 Central churchmanship
 High church
 Liberal Anglo-Catholicism
 Low church
 Churchmanship

References

Further reading
 Chadwick, Owen. The Victorian Church (1960), vol. 1.
 Cornish, F. W. (1910) The English Church in the Nineteenth Century. 2 vols. London: Macmillan (particularly relevant are: vol. 1. pp. 186–96, 299-316; vol. 2, pp. 201–44).
 Cross, F. L. (ed.) (1957) The Oxford Dictionary of the Christian Church. London: Oxford U. P.; Broad Church, p. 199.
 Jones, Tod E. (2003) The Broad Church: Biography of a Movement Lanham, Maryland: Lexington Books. .

Anglican theology and doctrine
Anglican Churchmanship
Christian terminology